Willett is a surname of English origin. Notable people with this name include:

Many « Willetts » are actually descendants of the French-Canadian family name « Ouellet » or « Ouellette ».

Surname

A–E
 Adam Willett (born 1982), American boxer
 Akito Willett (born 1988), West Indian cricketer
 Alan Willett (c. 1956–1999), American murderer
 Allan Willett (1936–2015), Lord Lieutenant of Kent
 Chad Willett (born 1971), Canadian television and film actor
 Cynthia Willett, Professor of Philosophy at Emory University
 Danny Willett (born 1987), English golfer
 Don Willett (born 1966), Supreme Court of Texas justice
 Ed Willett (1884–1934), American Major League Baseball pitcher
 Elquemedo Willett (born 1953), West Indian test cricketer
 Ernie Willett (1919–1985), English footballer

H–P
 Hurd Curtis Willett (1903–1992), American meteorologist
 Janice Willett, British television producer
 Jason Willett, American rock musician
 Jincy Willett, American author
 John Willett (1917–2002), English translator and scholar
 John B. Willett, Professor of Education at Harvard University
 Keith Willett, Professor of Orthopaedic Trauma Surgery at the University of Oxford
 Kenneth Martin Willett (1919–1942), American naval officer who died during World War II
 Lawrie Willett (born 1938), Australian public servant and university Chancellor
 Louis Willett (1945–1967), American soldier and Medal of Honor recipient
 Marinus Willett (1740–1830), American political leader and soldier during the American Revolution
 Michael J. Willett (born 1989), American actor and musician
 Mike Willett, (1933–2002), English cricketer
 Peter Willett, Professor of Information Science at the University of Sheffield, England

R–W
 Ray Willett (born 1941), Australian rules footballer
 Rodger Willett, Jr (born 1962), American compound archer
 Ron Willett (born 1944), a rugby league footballer
 Sabin Willett (born 1957), American novelist and lawyer
 Susan Somers-Willett, American poet
 Thomas Willett (1605–1674), first mayor of New York City
 Tonito Willett (born 1983), West Indian test cricketer
 Walter Willett (born 1945), Professor of Epidemiology and Nutrition at the  Harvard School of Public Health
 William Willett (disambiguation), multiple people, including:
William Willett (1856–1915), English builder and promoter of daylight saving time
William Willett, Jr. (1869–1938), U.S. Representative from New York (state) from 1907–1911
William Willett (Royal Navy officer) (1919–1976), an officer of the Royal Navy and Private Secretary to His Royal Highness the Duke of Edinburgh, consort of Queen Elizabeth II

Given name 
Willett Main (1828-1902), American politician from Wisconsin

See also 
Willetts, surname
Willet (disambiguation)
Willett (disambiguation)

English-language surnames